K-53 is a  state highway in the U.S. state of Kansas. Located entirely within Sumner County, K-53's western terminus is at U.S. Route 81 (US-81) south of Wichita and the eastern terminus is at an interchange with K-15 by Mulvane. Along the way, K-53 intersects Interstate 35 (I-35), also known as the Kansas Turnpike, at exit 33. The highway travels mostly through farmlands with the exception of inside Mulvane and is a two-lane road its entire length.

Before state highways were numbered in Kansas there were auto trails. The western terminus follows the former Meridian Highway and Southwest Trail. K-53 was designated a state highway by the Kansas State Highway Commission by 1927. Its alignment has remained the same since, except for minor realignments near the crossing of the Arkansas River. Between 1986 and 1987, an interchange was built to provide access to the Kansas Turnpike and I-35.

Route description
K-53 begins at US-81 on the Sedgwick–Sumner county line. It travels east through flat rural farmlands and after about  passes under I-35 and Kansas Turnpike. The highway continues about  then intersects a road that connects to exit 33 of I-35 and the Kansas Turnpike. K-53 continues for  then crosses Cowskin Creek and becomes surrounded by trees. The highway then passes to the north of a group of houses then transitions back to flat open farmlands. It continues to straddle the county line until it crosses the Arkansas River about  later. K-53 then turns southeast into Sumner County, remaining there the remainder of its length. The highway then curves east and enters the city of Mulvane becoming West Bridge Street. It continues another  to an at-grade crossing with a BNSF Railway track then curves north and becomes 1st Street. K-53 continues for about  then turns east onto Main Street. The highway continues for  where it passes under a BNSF Railway track and exits Mulvane. The road continues a short distance and reaches a partial cloverleaf interchange with K-15.

The Kansas Department of Transportation (KDOT) tracks the traffic levels on its highways. On K-53 in 2017, they determined that on average the traffic varied from 1,900 vehicles per day near the eastern terminus to 4,470 vehicles per day in Mulvane. K-53 is not included in the National Highway System. The National Highway System is a system of highways important to the nation's defense, economy, and mobility. K-53 is connected to the National Highway System at its intersection with I-35 and at its eastern terminus at K-15. The entire route is paved with partial design bituminous pavement. The entire  section of K-53 within Mulvane is maintained by the city.

History

Early roads
Before state highways were numbered in Kansas, there were auto trails, which were an informal network of marked routes that existed in the United States and Canada in the early part of the 20th century. K-53's western terminus was part of the South West Trail, which ran from El Paso, Texas to Chicago, Illinois; it was also part of the Meridian Highway, which ran from Laredo, Texas north to Pembina, North Dakota. The Meridian Highway was formed in 1911 in Kansas.

Establishment and realignments
K-53 was designated as a state highway by the Kansas State Highway Commission by 1927, to a highway extending from US-81 east to K-15 in Mulvane. In an August 24, 1949, resolution, it was approved to slightly realign K-53 near the crossing of the Arkansas River. Then in an August 13, 1952, resolution, K-53 was realigned again by the Arkansas River due to a new bridge being built across the river.

K-15, with which K-53 intersects at its eastern terminus, originally entered Mulvane from the east along East Main Street, then turned north at K-53 onto North Second Avenue and exited the city. In an October 28, 1953, resolution, it was approved to build a new alignment of K-15, from where it turned west towards Mulvane (East 119th Street), north to Derby. In early February 1954, the State Highway Commission approved a bid of $78,210 (equivalent to $ in ) for grading to T.F. Marbut of Emporia and a bid of $69,965 (equivalent to $ in ) for building of bridges to E.W. Geiger of Topeka for a roughly  section of K-15 from Derby southeast towards Mulvane. Then, on November 29, the commission approved a bid of $34,040 (equivalent to $ in ) for grading to Harry Henery of Ottawa and a bid of $67,875 (equivalent to $ in ) for building of three bridges to O.G. Brommer of Belleville for the remaining  section of K-15 toward Mulvane. By 1956, the new alignment of K-15 was complete, and at that time, K-53 was extended east along the former section of K-15 (East Main Street) to the new alignment. When the Kansas Turnpike was completed in 1956, there was no connection with K-53; between 1986 and 1987, exit 33 was completed along the turnpike to provide a connection between the two highways.

Major junctions

References

External links

Kansas Department of Transportation State Map
KDOT: Historic State Maps

053
Transportation in Sumner County, Kansas